Pokémon Mystery Dungeon: Blue Rescue Team and Pokémon Mystery Dungeon: Red Rescue Team are a matched pair of Pokémon video games for the Nintendo DS and Game Boy Advance, respectively. The games were developed by Chunsoft, published by The Pokémon Company, and distributed by Nintendo. Red Rescue Team was the last Pokémon game released for the Game Boy Advance. The two versions are mostly identical, with Blue Rescue Team taking advantage of the dual-screen features and increased graphical and sound capabilities of the Nintendo DS. The game has six Pokémon exclusive to each version.

Similar to the other Mystery Dungeon titles, the roguelike gameplay revolves around randomly changing dungeons which need to be explored by the player and their partner Pokémon using turn-based moves. The story focuses on the player who has been turned into a Pokémon and has developed amnesia who later joins a rescue team with a partner Pokémon while finding out who they are. As of July 25, 2007, Pokémon Mystery Dungeon: Blue Rescue Team had sold 3.08 million copies worldwide. Two sequels, Pokémon Mystery Dungeon: Explorers of Time and Explorers of Darkness, were released in Japan on September 13, 2007, and in North America on April 20, 2008. They featured Generation IV Pokémon, improved Wi-Fi features, and more touchscreen options.

The games received moderately positive reviews, with praise for their originality, while their gameplay and poor visuals were criticized. By 2007, the two games had accumulated lifetime sales of over 5.25 million copies. Red Rescue Team and Blue Rescue Team were released on the European Wii U Virtual Console on February 11, 2016 and on the Japanese Wii U Virtual Console on March 23, 2016. They were released on the North American Wii U Virtual Console on June 23, 2016.

An updated remake of the games titled Pokémon Mystery Dungeon: Rescue Team DX was released on March 6, 2020. The remake has mechanics that were introduced in Pokémon Mystery Dungeon: Gates To Infinity such as moves leveling up by use.

Gameplay

The player starts out as a human who turned into a Pokémon, which can be one of sixteen Pokémon (Bulbasaur, Charmander, Squirtle, Pikachu, Meowth, Psyduck, Machop, Cubone, Eevee, Chikorita, Cyndaquil, Totodile, Treecko, Torchic, Mudkip and Skitty) and is determined by a personality quiz taken at the beginning of the game. The player chooses a partner Pokémon which is one of ten Pokémon (which excludes the last six stated above and the Pokémon of the same type). The game is mission-based with many jobs, which can be found on the bulletin board, requested by mail, or initiated through story events, and include rescuing Pokémon, delivering items, and escorting clients. If the player successfully completes a job, they receive a reward, and Rescue Points, which increase a team's rank.

These jobs take part in dungeons, of which the layout is randomized. The objective is to either finish a job, or go through all the floors to find the exit. In the dungeon, there are wild Pokémon that battle with the player's team. These battles are turn-based, and take place in the dungeon map. Pokémon fight using the four moves they know, by using a standard "A button" attack, or using projectiles and other items. While going through the dungeon, the player gets hungry and has to eat food, either found in the dungeon or bought in advance.

The player will fail if the main character or a client that needs to be escorted is defeated. Before the credits, the player will also fail if the partner is defeated. However, supplementary allies (including the partner, after the credits) can be lost, at which point they will return to the base.

Plot
The player wakes up one day finding that they have been transformed into a Pokémon, without any memory of their past. In a world devastated by many natural disasters — that have only begun to happen quite recently —  the player and a newly made friend join forces and form a rescue team. The team meets other rescue teams, including a top-ranked rescue team consisting of Alakazam, Charizard, and Tyranitar, named Team ACT. The team makes enemies unwittingly with another rescue team, Team Meanies, consisting of Gengar, Ekans, and Medicham, who seek world domination under the disguise of a rescue team. Not far into the storyline, the player is told of a legend about a Ninetales laying a curse on a human who had deliberately grabbed Ninetales' tail. Ninetales predicted that the human would eventually be reborn as a Pokémon, and that the natural balance of the world would be upset. In the quest to discover the player's lost memory and purpose as a Pokémon, the team journeys to where the fortune-teller Xatu resides. Xatu is quick to realize that the player was once a human and tells that the player's human-to-Pokémon transformation is tied together with the natural disasters. This conversation is eavesdropped upon by Team Meanies' Gengar, who reveals the player's secret to the townsfolk and says that eliminating the human-turned-Pokémon in the legend would return the world to normal.

They are confronted by Alakazam, who says the Pokémon held a town meeting on what they must do to save the world: they must find and kill the player and anyone who sides with them. As they give the team one night to get away, the two leave Pokémon Square as fugitives and make their way to the northeasternmost part of the world in an effort to elude the teams that are now hunting them down. Along the way, they encounter the legendary birds Moltres and Articuno, who feel the effects of the disasters in their respective areas. They befriend an Absol who seeks to find the true cause of the natural disasters. The trio reaches the top of Mt. Freeze only to be cornered by Team ACT. They get ready to finish the player and partner off, but are stopped by Ninetales, who reveals that the player is not the human in the legend, that both parts of the legend are coincidental occurrences, and that the world is in greater danger caused by the awakening of Groudon. Team ACT proceeds to try and stop Groudon, while the team heads home to clear all remaining suspicion at Pokémon Square. After a few days, the player and the partner worry, as Team ACT has not come back from their mission to quell Groudon. Asking to rescue the missing Team ACT, Lombre refuses to let them go, saying there are plenty of tougher Pokémon than them. Shiftry convinces three of the strongest Pokémon, Blastoise, Octillery, and Golem, to form a special rescue team and rescue Team ACT. After a few days, the special team returns defeated.

After being discouraged by Gengar, the player and partner are able to get everyone's spirits back up, and volunteer to rescue Team ACT themselves. When the team reaches Magma Cavern, they find Charizard and Tyranitar defeated, with Alakazam fighting against Groudon alone before quickly being defeated. The team takes matters into their own hands and defeat Groudon. They return to town as heroes, but their celebration is short-lived as grave news arrives from Xatu. A huge meteor, revealed to be the true cause of the natural disasters, is heading for the world, threatening to destroy it. The only way to stop it is to ask for help from the sky guardian Rayquaza. It is less than cooperative, but after a battle, Rayquaza agrees to use its Hyper Beam to destroy the meteor. The team reawakens on the ground, surrounded by their supporters, where they find that the world is safe once again. However, the player must return to being a human and leave the Pokémon world behind. After the credits roll, the player returns to the rescue team base in Pokémon form and surprises everybody.

As time passes, many more secrets are revealed. A shard of the destroyed meteor opens a secret cave under Whiscash Pond, enabling evolution. It is later revealed that another shard hit Latias' wing, and the team rescues her at Pitfall Valley. It is eventually discovered that Gengar was the human from the legend; after uncomfortably getting the player's assistance, he manages to remove the part of the curse that affected his old partner Gardevoir.

Development and technical issue
First revealed in August 2005, the Japanese release date was announced in September. More details were released later that month, showing information about the gameplay and plot. In November, Nintendo announced a bug in the Blue Rescue Team version involving its connectivity with its GBA counterpart, Red Rescue Team, which would completely erase the contents of any other Game Boy Advance game besides Red Rescue Team that was loaded into the system.  Nintendo quickly patched the bug upon discovering it and issued a new shipment of replacement DS cards with the patch on December 8. At E3 2006, Nintendo announced the English release of the games and revealed the release date later that month.

Reception

The game has received mixed or average reviews. IGN rated the game a "Passable" 6.5, feeling that the DS version could have been better if it did not have to be made for Game Boy Advance. They stated, "For a game that encourages team play, it's amazing that Chunsoft missed the boat when it comes to exploring dungeons and finishing missions with a friend". The game has been criticized for its visuals, with reviewers stating that the DS version does not improve graphically on the GBA version. GameSpot gave it a 5.2, stating, "No matter how much you claim to love Pokémon, you should probably skip Pokémon Mystery Dungeon", further stating, "Chunsoft's dungeon hack game wasn't that good to begin with, and the injection of Pokémon elements hasn't done a thing to change that". 1UP gave the games an A−, saying, "you may realize the game isn't 'perfect,' but somehow it's addictive". GameSpy gave it a 4/5, stating, "It may confuse some and frustrate others, but its addictive nature should keep you hooked until you learn to appreciate the art of the dungeon crawl". Nintendo Power gave the game an 80/100, saying, "Mystery Dungeon is not perfect, but its robust and original aspects form a game more solid than many expected". Electronic Gaming Monthly gave the game a 7.2/10, stating, "storing and retrieving items is too much of a hassle"; they also did not like that when the player faints, they lose all of their valuable items.

By the end of 2006, Pokémon Mystery Dungeon: Blue Rescue Team had sold over 761,000 copies in Japan, while Red Rescue Team had sold just over 715,000 copies. As of July 25, 2007, Blue Rescue Team has sold 3.08 million copies worldwide while Red Rescue Team sold 2.20 million copies by March 31.

Sequels

The two games were released in Japan on September 13, 2007, and in North America on April 20, 2008. New features include the addition of Generation IV Pokémon, improved Wi-Fi features, and more touchscreen options.

See also 

Pokémon Mystery Dungeon: Ginji's Rescue Team (the manga serial based on the games)

Notes

References

External links
Pokémon Mystery Dungeon Official site

Role-playing video games
Chunsoft games
Game Boy Advance games
Nintendo DS games
Tactical role-playing video games
2005 video games
Video games developed in Japan
Video games featuring protagonists of selectable gender
Video games scored by Arata Iiyoshi
Video games with alternative versions
Video games using procedural generation
Virtual Console games for Wii U
Roguelike video games
Pokémon Mystery Dungeon